The Togian water monitor (Varanus togianus) is a species of monitor lizard.

It is endemic to the Togian Islands of Sulawesi, Indonesia.

The species is found primarily in forests and mangroves. It feeds on invertebrates including insects and arachnids as well as turtle and bird eggs.

References

Varanus
Endemic fauna of Indonesia
Reptiles of Indonesia
Reptiles described in 1872
Taxa named by Wilhelm Peters